Babicz Guitars (pronounced BAB-bits) is an American manufacturer of acoustic guitars and full contact hardware, as well as a producer of licensable guitar technology. The Babicz Guitars offices are in Poughkeepsie, New York.

History 
Babicz Guitars was established in late 2003 by Jeff Carano and Jeff Babicz. As the executive management team for the headless Steinberger Guitar Company in the 1980s and early 1990s.

References 

Guitar manufacturing companies of the United States
Manufacturing companies established in 2003
Companies based in New York (state)
Companies based in Dutchess County, New York
2003 establishments in New York (state)